Microlinyphia mandibulata is a species of sheetweb spider in the family Linyphiidae. It is found in the United States.

Subspecies
These two subspecies belong to the species Microlinyphia mandibulata:
 Microlinyphia mandibulata mandibulata (Emerton, 1882) i g b
 Microlinyphia mandibulata punctata (Chamberlin & Ivie, 1943) i c g b
Data sources: i = ITIS, c = Catalogue of Life, g = GBIF, b = Bugguide.net

References

Linyphiidae
Articles created by Qbugbot
Spiders described in 1882